

History 
In the 1959 Turin Universiade, South Korea participated as an observer and don't send competitors. In 1966, South Korea joined International University Sports Federation as an official member and participated in Summer World University Games in 1967.

Medal count

Summer Universiade 
South Korea has won 682 medals at the Summer Universiade and is in the sixth place on the all-time Summer Universiade medal table.

Winter Universiade 
South Korea has won 256 medals at the Winter Universiade and are in the third place on the all-time Winter Universiade medal table.

See also 

 South Korea at the Olympics
 South Korea at the Paralympics
 South Korea at the Asian Games

References 

 2015 Sport White Paper by Korea Institute of Sport Science

External links 

 
Nations at the Universiade